Yinglee Srijumpol (b. 27 March 1983) is a Thai Luk thung and morlam singer. She is best known for her single "Your Heart for My Number".

 YingLee played a live concert on December 2, 2022 at Hillary 1 Club in downtown Bangkok, Thailand.  YingLee and her dancers gave a delightful, energetic performance to the delight of her fans.

Life and career
Born as Thidarat Srijumpol, Srijumpol is from Na Pho, Buriram Province.

Srijumpol signed with SP Suphamit. Her first album was banned by the Thai Ministry of Culture for immorality. When her contract with SP expired, she returned to her birthplace, where she founded a Mor lam band. After the band's failure, Srijumpol moved to Bangkok and worked briefly in a hair salon.

In 2012, Srijumpol decided to return to entertainment. She signed with the GMM Grammy label. Her first studio album recorded by GMM Grammy was Kha Khao Sao Lam Sing. The album was a success. The single "Your number for my heart" was released in 2012 and hit No. 1 on Thai music charts in 2013, earning 237M YouTube views as of December 2021. Srijumpol received numerous accolades for the single, including the Siam Dara Star award for "Outstanding Luk Thung Song", and "Most Popular Female Luk Thung Song" at the Maha Nakhon Awards.

In 2017, Srijumpol was hospitalized for thyroid disease and forced to pause her singing career. In the same year, she opened a resort in Na Pho.

Discography

Albums

Single
 "Thee Rak Ruea Thee Phak" (ที่รักหรือที่พัก) (March 2019)

Filmography
 "Rueam Phon Khon Luk Thung Nguen Lan" (รวมพลคนลูกทุ่งเงินล้าน) (2013)
 "Mad Ded Sieang Thong" (หมัดเด็ดเสียงทอง) (2014)

References

1983 births
Living people
Yinglee Srijumpol
Yinglee Srijumpol
Yinglee Srijumpol